The Rumely Building is a heritage building located at 244–226 Pacific Avenue in the Central Business District of Saskatoon, Saskatchewan, Canada. Formerly serving as a warehouse for the Rumely Company, the building has been converted into residential condominium lofts with commercial units located on the ground floor.

History
The M. Rumely Company (a manufacturer of heavy farm equipment) in April 1912 started work on the construction of a new showroom/office/warehouse building on a railway spur line in the downtown area of Saskatoon.

In 2007, work started on five store additions on the south side of the building and conversion of the building into 30 condominium lofts.

References

Commercial buildings completed in 1913
Buildings and structures in Saskatoon
Residential condominiums in Canada
1913 establishments in Saskatchewan
Allis-Chalmers Manufacturing Company